Sweltsa is a genus of green stoneflies in the family Chloroperlidae. There are more than 50 described species in Sweltsa.

Species
These 54 species belong to the genus Sweltsa:

 Sweltsa abdominalis (Okamoto, 1912)
 Sweltsa adamantea Surdick, 1995
 Sweltsa albertensis (Needham & Claassen, 1925)
 Sweltsa assam Zwick, 1971
 Sweltsa baiyunshana Li, Yang & Yao, 2014
 Sweltsa borealis (Banks, 1895) (boreal sallfly)
 Sweltsa brevihamula Dong, Cui & Li, 2018
 Sweltsa californica (Jewett, 1965)
 Sweltsa coloradensis (Banks, 1898) (Colorado sallfly)
 Sweltsa colorata Zhiltzova & Levanidova, 1978
 Sweltsa continua (Banks, 1911)
 Sweltsa cristata Surdick, 1995
 Sweltsa durfeei Kondratieff & Baumann, 2009
 Sweltsa exquisita (Frison, 1935)
 Sweltsa fidelis (Banks, 1920)
 Sweltsa gaufini Baumann, 1973
 Sweltsa hamula Chen & Du, 2017
 Sweltsa hoffmani Kondratieff & Kirchner, 2009
 Sweltsa holstonensis Kondratieff & Kirchner, 1998
 Sweltsa hondo Baumann & Jacobi, 1984
 Sweltsa illiesi Zhiltzova & Levanidova, 1978
 Sweltsa insularis Zhiltzova, 1978
 Sweltsa kibunensis (Kawai, 1967)
 Sweltsa lamba (Needham & Claassen, 1925)
 Sweltsa lateralis (Banks, 1911) (curved sallfly)
 Sweltsa lepnevae Zhiltzova, 1977
 Sweltsa longistyla (Wu, 1938)
 Sweltsa lyrata Stark & Baumann, 2018
 Sweltsa mediana (Banks, 1911)
 Sweltsa mogollonica Stark & Baumann, 2018
 Sweltsa naica (Provancher, 1876) (northeastern sallfly)
 Sweltsa nikkoensis (Okamoto, 1912)
 Sweltsa occidens (Frison, 1937)
 Sweltsa onkos (Ricker, 1935) (Ontario sallfly)
 Sweltsa oregonensis (Frison, 1935)
 Sweltsa pacifica (Banks, 1895)
 Sweltsa palearata Surdick, 2004
 Sweltsa pisteri Baumann & Bottorff, 1997
 Sweltsa pocahontas Kirchner & Kondratieff, 1988
 Sweltsa recurvata (Wu, 1938)
 Sweltsa resima Surdick, 1995
 Sweltsa revelstoka (Jewett, 1955)
 Sweltsa salix Lee & Baumann, 2010
 Sweltsa shibakawae (Okamoto, 1912)
 Sweltsa tamalpa (Ricker, 1952)
 Sweltsa tibetensis Li, Pan & Liu, 2017
 Sweltsa townesi (Ricker, 1952)
 Sweltsa umbonata Surdick, 1995
 Sweltsa urticae (Ricker, 1952)
 Sweltsa voshelli Kondratieff & Kirchner, 1991
 Sweltsa wui Stark & Sivec, 2009
 Sweltsa yunnan Tierno de Figueroa & Fochetti, 2002
 Sweltsa yurok Stark & Baumann, 2007
 Sweltsa zhiltzovae Zwick, 2010

References

Further reading

External links

 

Chloroperlidae
Articles created by Qbugbot
Plecoptera genera